Patrick J. Carley (February 2, 1866 – February 25, 1936)  was an American businessman and politician who served four terms as a U.S. Representative from New York from 1927 to 1935.

Life and career
P. J. Carley was born in County Roscommon, Ireland (then a part of the U.K.) on February 2, 1866.  He was educated in Ireland and immigrated to the United States when he was 17, settling in Brooklyn, New York.  He became active in construction and real estate development, eventually owning and operating his own firm, P. J. Carley & Sons.  He was also involved in banking and several civic causes, including support of the Bay Ridge Memorial Hospital.

Tenure in Congress
In 1926 Carley was elected as a Democrat to the Seventieth Congress.  He was reelected three times, and served from March 4, 1927, to January 3, 1935.  From 1932 to 1933 he was Chairman of the House Committee on the Election of the President, Vice President, and Representatives.

Later career and death 
Carley was not a candidate for renomination in 1934 and resumed his construction and other business interests.

Death and burial
Carley died in Brooklyn on February 25, 1936, and was buried in Calvary Cemetery in Queens, New York.

References

External resources
 
 Patrick J. Carley at Political Graveyard

1936 deaths
1866 births
Burials at Calvary Cemetery (Queens)
Politicians from Brooklyn
Politicians from County Roscommon
Irish emigrants to the United States (before 1923)
Missing middle or first names
Democratic Party members of the United States House of Representatives from New York (state)